Philip I (1143 – 1 August 1191), commonly known as Philip of Alsace, was count of Flanders from 1168 to 1191. During his rule Flanders prospered economically. He took part in two crusades and died of disease in the Holy Land.

Count of Flanders

Philip was born in 1143 as the son of Count Thierry of Flanders and Sibylla of Anjou. His reign began at the age of 14 in 1157, while he acted as regent and co-count for his father, who had returned to the Kingdom of Jerusalem in 1156 after participating the Second Crusade. He defeated Count Floris III of Holland, who was captured in Bruges and remained in prison until 1167, at which point he was being ransomed in exchange for recognition of Flemish suzerainty over Zeeland. By inheritance, Philip also recovered for Flanders the territories of Waasland and Quatre-Métiers.

In 1159, Philip married Elisabeth, elder daughter of count Ralph I of Vermandois and Petronilla of Aquitaine. Upon the abdication of his brother-in-law Ralph II in 1167, Elisabeth and Philip inherited the County of Vermandois. This pushed Flemish authority further south, to its greatest extent thus far, and threatened to completely alter the balance of power in northern France.

Philip governed wisely with the aid of Robert d'Aire, whose role was almost that of a prime minister. They established an effective administrative system and Philip's foreign relations were excellent.  He mediated in disputes between Louis VII of France and Henry II of England, between Henry II and Thomas Becket, and arranged the marriage of his sister Margaret with Count Baldwin V of Hainaut.

Philip and Elisabeth were childless. In 1175, Philip discovered that Elisabeth was committing adultery and had her lover, Walter de Fontaines, beaten to death. Philip then obtained complete control of her lands in Vermandois from King Louis VII of France. Philip's brothers Matthew and Peter of Alsace also died in 1177, before going on crusade, he designated Margaret and Baldwin as his heirs.

Philip's first crusade

In the Holy Land, Philip hoped to take part in a planned invasion of Egypt, for which purpose the crusaders had allied with the Byzantine Empire. A Byzantine fleet of 150 galleys was waiting at Acre when Philip arrived on 2 August. Philip had other plans, however. He and King Baldwin IV of Jerusalem were first cousins, sharing a grandfather, King Fulk, whose daughter from his first marriage, Sibylla of Anjou, was Philip's mother. Baldwin IV was a leper and childless, and offered Philip the regency of the Kingdom of Jerusalem as his closest male relative currently present there. Philip refused both this and the command of the army of the kingdom, saying he was there only as a pilgrim. Instead Baldwin appointed Raynald of Châtillon, to whom Philip would act as an assistant. As William of Tyre says, "this being the situation, the count at last revealed the secret thought of his mind and did not try to conceal to what end all his plans were." He had come to have his own vassals married to his cousins, Baldwin's sister Sibylla and half-sister Isabella.

Sibylla's husband William of Montferrat had just died, leaving her pregnant with the future Baldwin V.  William of Tyre, the chief negotiator in this dispute, told the count it would be improper to marry her off again so soon. According to the chronicle of Ernoul, Philip was also rebuffed by Raymond III of Tripoli, who also claimed the regency, as well as by Raymond's supporters from the Ibelins, who hoped to marry the princesses into their own family. Baldwin of Ibelin insulted the count in public. Philip left Jerusalem in October to campaign in the north for the Principality of Antioch, participating in an unsuccessful siege of Harim before returning home. Meanwhile, the Byzantine alliance against Egypt was abandoned.  In November, Baldwin IV and Raynald defeated Saladin at the Battle of Montgisard.

War with France

Philip returned from Palestine in 1179, at which point Louis VII, now sick, named him guardian of his young son Philip II.  One year later, Philip of Alsace had his protégé married to his niece, Isabelle of Hainaut, offering the County of Artois and other Flemish territories as dowry, much to the dismay of Baldwin V. When Louis VII died, Philip II began to assert his independence. War broke out in 1180. Picardy and Île-de-France were devastated.  King Philip refused to give open battle and gained the upper hand.  Baldwin V, at first allied with his brother-in-law, intervened in 1184 on behalf of his son-in-law, King Philip, in support of his daughter's interests. The dispute between Count Philip and Baldwin was encouraged by King Philip, who went so far as to name Baldwin his representative in negotiations with the Count.

Philip's wife, Elisabeth, died in 1183, prompting King Philip II to seize the province of Vermandois on behalf of Elisabeth's sister, Eleonore. Philip then remarried, to Matilda, daughter of Afonso I, the first King of Portugal. Philip gave Matilda a dower that included a number of major Flemish towns, in an apparent slight to Baldwin V. Fearing that he would be surrounded by the royal domain of France and the County of Hainaut, Philip signed a peace treaty with King Philip II and Count Baldwin V on 10 March 1186, recognizing the cession of Vermandois to the king, although he was allowed to retain the title Count of Vermandois for the remainder of his life.

Philip's second crusade

In 1190, Philip took the cross for a second time and joined the Flemish contingents which had already gone to Palestine. After arriving at the Siege of Acre, he was stricken by the epidemic passing through the crusader camp, and died on 1 August 1191. His body was brought back to Flanders by his wife Theresa, who acted as regent during his absence. Philip was buried in Clairvaux Abbey. Since he was unsuccessful in producing an heir with Countess Matilda, he was succeeded by his sister Margaret I and brother-in-law Baldwin VIII.

Philip had an illegitimate son, Thierry, who went on the Fourth Crusade and married the daughter of Isaac Komnenos of Cyprus.

Legacy

Philip seems to represent the end of one kind of feudal world and the beginning of a new type of sovereignty, put into practice by King Philip: for the first time, a king of France ruled over a count of Flanders. Despite a costly war, the economic expansion of Flanders did not stop, as witnessed by the number of communal charters signed by Count Philip.  By the end of his reign, the county had entered into a period of unprecedented prosperity.

Philip may have been the patron of Chrétien de Troyes while he was writing his last romance, Perceval, the Story of the Grail. In the opening lines, Chrétien honours Philip with "excessive praise" (Roach, Frappier, Hilka, et al.) for providing him with the book he adapted into the "best tale ever told in a royal court". The work, which was obviously begun sometime before Philip's death, remains unfinished.

References

Sources

1191 deaths
House of Metz
Counts of Flanders
Counts of Valois
Christians of the Third Crusade
Deaths from infectious disease
1143 births
12th-century people from the county of Flanders